The 1905 Ohio Green and White football team represented Ohio University in the 1905 college football season as an independent. Led by Joseph Railsback in his first only year as head coach, the Green and White compiled a record of 2–5–2, being outscored 48–141.

Schedule

References

Ohio
Ohio Bobcats football seasons
Ohio Green and White football